Jason Devon Bostic (born June 30, 1976, in Fort Lauderdale, Florida) is a former American football defensive back in the National Football League for the Philadelphia Eagles and the Buffalo Bills.  He played college football at Georgia Tech. He attended Cardinal Gibbons HS in Fort Lauderdale, where he primarily played as a running back.

Living people
1976 births
American football cornerbacks
American football safeties
Georgia Tech Yellow Jackets football players
Buffalo Bills players
Philadelphia Eagles players
Players of American football from Fort Lauderdale, Florida